Captain Maríano Bucio Ramirez (born 2 November 1942) is a Mexican equestrian. He competed at the 1972 Summer Olympics and the 1976 Summer Olympics.

References

1942 births
Living people
Mexican male equestrians
Olympic equestrians of Mexico
Equestrians at the 1972 Summer Olympics
Equestrians at the 1976 Summer Olympics
Equestrians at the 1975 Pan American Games
Pan American Games bronze medalists for Mexico
Pan American Games medalists in equestrian
Place of birth missing (living people)
Medalists at the 1975 Pan American Games